Namibia held two subnational elections in 1998. Local Authority Council elections were held on 16 February 1998.  Regional Council elections were held from 30 November to 1 December 1998.

Results

Local Authority Councils

Regional Councils
A total of 738,870 voters were registered, but 204,592 were in uncontested constituencies.

References

Local and regional elections in Namibia
Namibia
1998 in Namibia